Cipadessa is a genus of plants belonging to the family Meliaceae. Cipadessa is monotypic, with the single species Cipadessa baccifera. The species is endemic to Western Ghats of India and Sri Lanka. It is a host plant for many moth species.

Description
It is a small shrub with only 5m tall. Leaves compound, imparipinnate; lamina elliptic, apex acute to acuminate; base acute, cuneate or attenuate with entire margin. Flowers are white colored and show  axillary panicles inflorescence. Fruit is a globose drupe with 5 pyrenes.

Common names
Source:
Hindi — Nalbila 
Marathi — Ranabili, Gudmai 
Tamil — Puilipan cheddi, Savattuchedi,  
Malayalam — Kaipanarangi, Potti, Pulippanchedi 
Kannada — Narsullu, Chitunde, Bettada Bevu, Karbe, Sidigolii, Chitunde, Adusoge 
Urdu — Ranabili
Sinhala — Halbemiya (හල්බැමිය)

References

Meliaceae
Meliaceae genera
Flora of China
Flora of tropical Asia
Monotypic Sapindales genera